Syamba is a rural locality (a settlement) in Yavengskoye Rural Settlement, Vozhegodsky District, Vologda Oblast, Russia. The population was 72 as of 2002.

Geography 
Syamba is located 10 km north of Vozhega (the district's administrative centre) by road. Molodyozhny is the nearest rural locality.

References 

Rural localities in Vozhegodsky District